Bigfork Village Hall is a historic fieldstone municipal hall built in 1936 with Works Progress Administration funds to provide a government and community center in Bigfork, Minnesota, United States. It remains at its original location on Minnesota State Highway 38 and is listed on the National Register of Historic Places.

See also
 List of city and town halls in the United States

References

1936 establishments in Minnesota
Buildings and structures in Itasca County, Minnesota
City and town halls in Minnesota
City and town halls on the National Register of Historic Places in Minnesota
Government buildings completed in 1936
National Register of Historic Places in Itasca County, Minnesota
Works Progress Administration in Minnesota